Volksflugzeug can refer to:

 Any one of a number of projects to produce a Volksflugzeug, a German popular aircraft design, including:
Junkers A50
Bücker Bü 180 
Klemm Kl 105
Siebel Si 202
Fieseler Fi 253  
Gotha Go 150
 Volksflugzeug GmbH, a German manufacturer also known as PowerTrike GmbH